Tony Mulcahy (born 12 April 1959) is an Irish former Fine Gael politician. He was elected to Seanad Éireann on the Labour Panel in April 2011. He was a member of Clare County Council and Shannon Town Council from 1999 to 2011, representing the Shannon electoral area. He was an unsuccessful candidate for the Clare constituency of Dáil Éireann at the 2007 and 2011 general elections.

He was the Fine Gael Seanad Spokesperson on Communications, Energy and Natural Resources.

He lost his seat in the 2016 Seanad election.

References

1959 births
Living people
Fine Gael senators
Members of the 24th Seanad
Local councillors in County Clare